"The World We Knew (Over and Over)" is a popular song recorded by Frank Sinatra in 1967. It is based on a composition by Bert Kaempfert, a German musician and composer.

The song first appeared on Sinatra's 1967 album The World We Knew and was released as a single later that year. "The World We Knew (Over and Over)" peaked at number thirty on the Billboard Hot 100 chart in September 1967. On the Billboard easy listening chart, it spent five weeks at number one, and was Sinatra's sixth and final single to top that chart.

Charles Aznavour adapted the song to French for Paul Mauriat and Mireille Mathieu called "Un monde avec toi".
Fred Bongusto adapted the song to Italian called "Ore D'Amore".
Josh Groban covered the song in his album "Harmony."

See also
List of number-one adult contemporary singles of 1967 (U.S.)

References

1967 singles
Frank Sinatra songs
Songs with music by Bert Kaempfert
Song recordings produced by Jimmy Bowen
Songs written by Carl Sigman
1967 songs
Reprise Records singles
Songs with music by Herbert Rehbein
Torch songs